The Unauthorized Full House Story is a 2015 American television drama film directed by Brian K. Roberts and written by Ron McGee. It follows the behind-the-scenes making of the sitcom Full House. It stars Garrett Brawith, Justin Mader, Justin Gaston, Stephanie Bennett, Shelby Armstrong, Brittney Wilson, and Dakota Guppy. It premiered on Lifetime on August 22, 2015, drawing 1.6 million viewers.

Plot

The behind the scenes story of the TV show Full House.

Cast
Garrett Brawith as Bob Saget
Justin Mader as Dave Coulier
Justin Gaston as John Stamos
Stephanie Bennett as Lori Loughlin
Shelby Armstrong as Younger Candace Cameron
Brittney Wilson as Older Candace Cameron
Dakota Guppy as Younger Jodie Sweetin
Jordyn Ashley Olson as Older Jodie Sweetin
Blaise Todd as Toddler Mary-Kate Olsen
Kinslea Todd as Toddler Ashley Olsen
Calla Jones as Mary-Kate Olsen Age 6
Tyla Jones as Ashley Olsen Age 6
Kylie Armstrong as Mary-Kate Olsen Age 9
Jordan Armstrong as Ashley Olsen Age 9
Aislyn Watson as Younger Andrea Barber
Jaime Schneider as Older Andrea Barber
Ali Liebert as Gay Saget
Ashley Diana Morris as Rebecca Romijn

References

External links
 

2015 television films
2015 films
American films based on actual events
2015 drama films
American drama television films
Lifetime (TV network) films
Films about television
2010s English-language films
2010s American films